Kabil Lahsen (born 31 December 1971) is a Moroccan boxer. He competed in the men's welterweight event at the 1996 Summer Olympics.

References

1971 births
Living people
Moroccan male boxers
Olympic boxers of Morocco
Boxers at the 1996 Summer Olympics
Place of birth missing (living people)
Welterweight boxers
20th-century Moroccan people